South Plains Council serves Scouts in the area of Lubbock, Texas.

Organization 
 Chaparral District (Including Tasiwoo chapter)
 Comanche Trail District
 George White District
 Haynes District
 Quanah Parker District

Camps 
It was named in honor of cereal magnate, C.W. Post, who founded the nearby town. The camp is located along the Caprock Escarpment of the Llano Estacado in the area formerly occupied by the headquarters of the Llano Ranch, also known as the Curry Comb Ranch. Camp Post utilizes the Curry Comb brand in its insignia, a capital T with two horizontal bars above it.

History 
In 1883 they moved their ranch headquarters to the current site of Camp Post. A two-story frame house was built and a well was dug, this being the first hand-dug well in Garza County. The old well site is still visible today, and is located just south of Pioneer road, about halfway between the trading post and the swimming pool. The original wooden curb burned in 1937 and has been replaced by a replica.

The first recorded birth and death in Garza County took place here in February 1884, when Kate McCommis was born, daughter of Jim and Della Browning McCommis.  She died the same day.  Her grave is located about 150 feet southeast of the present-day dining hall.

C. W. Post purchased the land from the Llano Cattle Company in 1907 to pursue his dream of building a city.

In 1926, the Post estate gave , encompassing the former ranch headquarters, to the South Plains Council of the Boy Scouts of America for use as a camp.

Facilities 
Camp Post's facilities include 12 camping areas, a dining hall, a ropes course, a rifle range, an archery range, an equestrian center, swimming pool, campfire ring, trading post, the OA Lodge, and the Mallet training center, used for leathercraft.  A rustic outdoor chapel was built in 1959 by Phi Delta Theta fraternity.

Activities 
Activities include shooting sports (BB guns, pellet guns, .22 rifle, and shotgun), archery, astronomy, horseshoes, fishing, fire-building, storytelling, first aid, geocaching, roping, hiking, leathercraft, knot-tying, canoeing, and outdoor cookery.  Weekend campouts for area scouts are regularly scheduled including Cowboy Camp, Cub Camp, and Webeloes Woods.

Natural resources 
Water resources include Cottonwood Creek, Bobcat Creek, Dove Canyon Creek, Falls Canyon Creek, and Lake Marjorie. Common birds include American robin, cardinal, and mockingbird.  Mammal species include bobcat and coyote.  Some of the common trees are cottonwood, mesquite, and juniper. Common grasses include blue grama, buffalograss, hooded windmillgrass, perennial three-awn, plains bristlegrass, sideoats grama, and silver bluestem.  Other plant life commonly seen include feather dalea, yucca, prickly-pear cactus, and cholla.

Order of the Arrow 
South Plains Council is served by Nakona Lodge 150 of the Order of the Arrow.

External links 
  South Plains Council, B.S.A. - Camp Post
  History of Camp Post
 Curry Comb Ranch at Handbook of Texas Online
 Aerial View of Camp Post from Google Maps
 History

References 

Local councils of the Boy Scouts of America
Southern Region (Boy Scouts of America)
1925 establishments in Texas